Maccabi Nujeidat F.C. is an Israeli football club based in Bu'eine Nujeidat. The club currently plays in Liga Bet North B division.

History
The club was founded in 2016, following the demise of Hapoel Bnei Nujeidat and was named after local soldier Ahmad Nujeidat, who was killed in a car accident. In its first season the club finished 1st in its division and was promoted to Liga Bet.

Honours

League

References

External links
Maccabi Nujeidat The Israel Football Association 

Bu'eine Nujeidat
Association football clubs established in 2016
2016 establishments in Israel
Maccabi football clubs
Arab-Israeli football clubs